Thomas Long may refer to:

Politicians
Thomas Long (Ontario politician) (1836–1920), Ontario merchant and political figure
Thomas Long (fl.1407–1437), MP for Rye
Thomas Long of Draycot (c. 1451–1508), English knight and politician
Thomas Long (died 1593), MP for Westbury
Thomas Long (captain), American whaler
Thomas W. Long (born 1929), American politician in the New Jersey General Assembly
Thomas Warren Long (1839–1917), African Methodist Episcopal minister and politician in Florida

Others
Thomas Long (writer) (1621–1707), English clergyman and controversialist
Thomas J. Long (c. 1910–1993), American accountant and businessman who co-founded Longs Drugs
Thomas G. Long, Bandy Professor of Preaching at Candler School of Theology at Emory University
Thomas Long (baseball) (1860–1914), baseball player

See also
Tom Long (disambiguation)